The Nashua Broadband Tshwane Capital Classic, also called NBT Capital Classic or Tshwane Capital Classic is a single day men's road bicycle racing race held in South Africa, which was held for the first time in 2006.

Past winners

References
 

Cycle races in South Africa
Recurring sporting events established in 2006
Men's road bicycle races
2006 establishments in South Africa
Defunct cycling races in South Africa
Recurring sporting events disestablished in 2008
2008 disestablishments in South Africa